Namayan (Baybayin: Pre-Kudlit:  or  (Sapa),), also called Sapa, Maysapan or Nasapan, and sometimes Lamayan, was an independent indigenous polity on the banks of the Pasig River in the Philippines. It is believed to have achieved its peak in 1175, and to have gone into decline some time in the 13th century, although it continued to be inhabited until the arrival of European colonizers in the 1570s. 

Formed by a confederation of barangays, it was one of several polities on the Pasig River just prior to the Spanish colonization of the Philippines, alongside Tondo, Maynila, and Cainta.

Archeological findings in Santa Ana, Namayan's former seat of power, have produced the oldest evidence of continuous habitation among the Pasig river polities, pre-dating artifacts found within the historical sites of Maynila and Tondo.

Sources 
Historians studying Namayan have the advantage of being able to draw both from written sources and from artifacts uncovered in controlled archeological digs.

The most prominent primary written sources regarding precolonial Namayan is "Estado Geográfico, Topográfico, Estadístico, Histórico-Religioso de la Santa y Apostólica Província de San Gregorio Magno", published in 1865 by Franciscan scholar Fr. Felix de Huerta. His description of Namayan included important details such as the extent of Namayan's territories, and the lineage of its rulers.

Controlled archaeological excavations conducted by the National Museum of the Philippines in the 1960s, meantime, produced artifacts from a pre-Hispanic grave site within the Santa Ana Church complex, providing important information about maritime trade around Southeast Asia and China from 12th to 15th century AD, as well as the elaborate mortuary practices of Namayan's inhabitants.

Capital sites
Three present-day locations are identified as the political centres of Namayan. Two of these are within today's Santa Ana, Manila, and the other is now a barangay of the Mandaluyong across the river from the other sites.

Sapa 
The site most associated with the kingdom is the town proper of Santa Ana, which grew around  Our Lady of the Abandoned Parish. This site did not become the main settlement until 1578, when Franciscan missionaries built the first church some distance from the original town. Local referred to the site as "Maysapan" or “Sapà”.

Sapà is the Tagalog and Kapampangan word for a small creek. Nearby bodies of water matching the description include what are now Estero de Tripa de Gallina (“Rooster’s Gut Estuary”) and a smaller creek in the vicinity of modern Del Pan, Havana, and Tejerón streets. However, old Santa Ana was known for being "criss-crossed by brooks and creeks", any number of which could have been obscured by urbanization.

Christianised into Santa Ana de Sapa, the name eventually encompassed the modern Santa ana district of the City of Manila. De Huerta notes that "this town takes its name from the titular saint and the addition of Sapa for its having been established in a site immediately upon an estuary or rivulet proceeding from the Pasig River, which the natives call Sapa and the name of the town itself."

Lamayan 
Instead of the Nasapan site, local traditions say that an area called Lamayan (Tagalog and Kapampangan for "the place where a wake was held"), on the banks of the Pasig itself. It was the site of the ancient capital from which Lakan Tagkan and Buwan once ruled. It is still recognisable today because the modern street still bears its name.

Namayan, Mandaluyong 
A third location, Barangay Namayan in Mandaluyong, bears the name of the kingdom, and was likely part of the polity, given its location on the opposite shore from Lamayan.

Territory
Namayan's territory has been described bordering Manila Bay, the Pasig River, and Laguna de Bay. A more precise description of Namayan's administrative area is given by Fr. de Huerta, who, noting that Namayan was a confederation of several barangays, identified these component communities as they were named during the mid 19th century.

Namayan citizens called by the Army of Datu Makitan [Bai-Sai] shortened in Visayan dialect means [Bai ang ilahang sala atong ihatag sa ilaha] "Inilad" equivalent to deceived.

Most are now districts or barangays within the modern City of Manila:
Maysapan (the royal seat; now the district of Santa Ana)
Meycatmon (which literally means "a place with Catmon (Dillenia indica) trees")
Calatondangan (Kalatundungan)
Dongos (Dungos)
Dibag
Pinacauasan
Yamagtogon 
Dilao (Paco)
Pandacan
Quiapo
Sampaloc
San Miguel

Four settlements are now separate cities in and around Metro Manila:

San Juan del Monte (now San Juan)
San Felipe Neri (now Mandaluyong)
San Pedro de Macati (now Makati)
Taytay, Rizal

Administrative and political records of Spanish Manila indicate that these settlements mentioned as territories of the Kingdom of Sapa were recorded in 1578 as parts and visitas (satellite settlements) of Sta. Ana de Sapa.

A number of these settlements' names are no longer used today, but Philippine National Artist for Literature Nick Joaquin, in his book "Manila My Manila: A History for the Young", says that the kingdom's territories included what are now Santa Ana, Quiapo, San Miguel, Sampaloc, Santa Mesa, Paco, Pandacan in Manila; Mandaluyong, San Juan, Makati, Pasay, Pateros, Taguig, Taytay, and Parañaque.

Economic activities
Huerta describes the original settlement in Sta Ana as a fishing village that had other industries including carpentry, masonry, piña (pineapple cloth) embroidery, tinapá, cigars, bricks, sugar and bread.

This contrasts sharply with the economic activities of the contemporaneous polities of Tondo and Maynila, which monopolized the influx of goods coming from China, and monopolized the re-sale of the same Chinese goods to other ports in the archipelago, respectively.

Gold as currency

The Namayans, like Tondo, used Piloncitos, small gold ingots some of the size of a corn kernel—and weighing from 0.09 to 2.65 grams. Large Piloncitos weighing 2.65 grams approximate the weight of one mass. Piloncitos have been excavated from Mandaluyong, Bataan and the banks of the Pasig River.

Other than Piloncitos, the Namayans also used Gold rings, or gold ring-like ingots, very similar to the first coins invented in the Kingdom of Lydia in the present day Turkey. Barter rings were circulated in the Philippines up to the 16th century.

Rulers
Fray Huerta also recorded the genealogy of Namayan's ruling family, tracing it to a Lakan Tagkan (also known as Lacantagcan, or Lakan Takhan in some oral histories), and his wife Buan. Under the heading "Santa Ana", he records:
"In origin of the natives of this town comes from a ruler ("regulo") called Lacantagcan, and his wife named Bouan, lords ("señores") of the Namayan territories [...] The first Christian name found in the genealogical tree of this great ("gran") family is a certain Martin in this form. Martin, son of Calamayin: Calamayin, son of Laboy, Laboy, son of Palaba, and Palaba, firstborn son of the ruler ("regulo") Lacantagcan and his wife Bouan."

Historian William Henry Scott notes that "Rajah Kalamayin" was the name of the ruler of Namayan at the point of colonial contact in the early 1570s, and Huerta here records that his son was baptized "Martin" upon conversion to Roman Catholicism. Huerta only traces the genealogical tree of Lacan Tagcan back through Martin, and thus only mentions the eldest of Tagcan and Bouan's sons, Palaba.  The other four sons of Tagcan are not named, and no daughters are mentioned.

Huerta does go on, however, to mention that Tagcan had another male son, named Pasay, whose mother was a Bornean slave:

"The said Lacantagcan, in addition to five children of his legitimate wife Bouan, had a bastard ("bastardo") with a slave of Bornean lineage ("esclava de casta bornea"), called Pasay, who was the origin of the town known by the same name, for having fixed there his residence as land owner, supported by his father."

While Huerta thus definitively establishes that the rulers of Namayan and the settlement called Pasay were related, the precise nature of their relationship during the 1500s is unclear: Scott records that during that period, Pasay's rulers interacted with the Spanish themselves instead of "Rajah Kalamayin" speaking on their behalf.

Some local oral traditions cite Tagkan's child Pasay as a daughter, bestowing her with the title "Dayang-dayang" ("princess"). However, the descriptor "bastardo" (bastard), used by Huerta, is masculine in form.

Historian Grace Odal-Devora notes that Kapampangan oral histories also mention a "Sultana Kalangitan", described as "the Lady of the Pasig" who ruled the Kingdom of Namayan. She is said to have been the grandmother of "Prinsipe Balagtas" (or Bagtas), and the legend says that the Kapampangan people are descended from him. Odal notes that this demonstrates the interconnections of the Tagalog ruling elites.

Documented rulers of Namayan 
The rulers of Namayan from the period of colonial contact (the 1570s) back to three prior generations, were documented by Franciscan Historian Fray Felix Huerta in the work Estado geográfico, topográfico, estadístico, histórico- religioso de la santa y apostólica Provincia de San Gregorio Magno ("Geographical, topographical, statistical, historical and religious state of the holy and apostolic province of St. Gregory the Great"), a record of the histories of Franciscan missions which is now a primary resource for local histories of Philippine municipalities.

Legendary rulers of Namayan 

Aside from the records of Huerta, a number of names of rulers are associated with Namayan by folk/oral traditions, as recounted in documents such as the will of Fernando Malang (1589) and documented by academics such as Grace Odal-Devora and writers such as Nick Joaquin.

After colonisation
When the parish of Sta. Ana de Sapa was founded in 1578, Franciscan missionaries chose to build their church, and eventually another settlement, some distance away from the ancient town. The result is that the present-day Santa Ana is no longer located at the original site of the capital of Namayan. This has raised some questions about pre-colonial graves that have recently been excavated near the Santa Ana church.

See also

Rajahnate of Maynila
Tondo (historical polity)
Cainta (historical polity)
Hinduism in the Philippines
History of the Philippines (900–1521)
Tagalog people
History of Luzon

Notes

References

Further reading

 Nick Joaquin's Almanac for Manileños
 The River Dwellers by Grace P. Odal
 

1175 establishments in Asia
1571 disestablishments
Barangay states
Historical regions
Indianized kingdoms
Former countries in Philippine history
History of the Philippines (900–1565)
History of Metro Manila
History of Luzon